Kalanit Grill-Spector is a professor of Psychology at Stanford University and the Wu Tsai Neurosciences Institute at Stanford University. She is best known for developing fMRI adaptation, a technique useful for studying the sensitivity of neurons in the brain to changes of a stimulus.

Life 
Grill-Spector studied Electrical Engineering and Computer Science at the Ben-Gurion University of the Negev from 1987 to 1990. In 1994, she continued her studies at the Weizmann Institute of Science, where she gained a PhD in 1999. From 1999 to 2001 she worked as a postdoc at the Massachusetts Institute of Technology, before she followed an invitation to Stanford University, where she teaches now.

Achievements and awards 
Grill-Spector has received several fellowships including Human Sciences Frontier Fellowship, the Sloan Fellowship, and the Klingenstein Fellowship in Neuroscience. She has also served as an Editor for the Journal of Vision (2008–2012) and Neuropsychologia (2016–2018).

References

External links 
Vision & Perception Neuroscience Lab | Stanford University

Living people
American neuroscientists
American women neuroscientists
Stanford University faculty
Year of birth missing (living people)
Jewish women scientists
Jewish American scientists
Cognitive neuroscientists
Neuroimaging researchers
21st-century American Jews
21st-century American women